South Plymouth is an unincorporated community in Fayette County, in the U.S. state of Ohio.

History
A post office was established at South Plymouth in 1852, and remained in operation until 1877.

References

Unincorporated communities in Fayette County, Ohio
Unincorporated communities in Ohio